Temple Records may refer to:
Temple Records (1978 UK label), a record label started by Robin Morton
Temple US Records